The Anglican Diocese of Igbomina is one of eight within the Anglican Province of Kwara, itself one of 14 provinces within the Church of Nigeria. Bishop  Michael Akinyemi,
who was also the Archbishop of the Province, retired in 2017 and was succeeded by Emmanuel Adekola, previously Sub-Dean of the Cathedral Church of the Advent, Abuja.

Akinyemi was the founding bishop of Igbomina, a post he held from 1999.

Bishops of Igbomina 
 1999 - 2017 Bishop Michael Akinyemi
 2017 - date Bishop Emmanuel Adekola

Notes

Church of Nigeria dioceses
Dioceses of the Province of Kwara